The LG KS360 is a mobile phone manufactured by LG Electronics, released in Q3 2008.  The model is marketed in some regions as the "Webslider" and "Neon".

Features
The phone is geared towards text messaging and social networking, with a full QWERTY keyboard and a threaded conversation view for faster texting. It also has a heat-sensitive screen that can be used for dialing numbers. The phone can use MicroSD cards of up to 4GB in size. The phone has Bluetooth 2.0, and WAP and GPRS are used to connect to the internet. Aimed at the youth market, the phone is available in black with blue, light pink and black, black and silver and red and pink.

The phone also has a numeric keypad and several other features.

References

External links
User WEB page How to program in BASIC on your LG Phone!

KS360
Mobile phones with an integrated hardware keyboard